Villa Pisani at Stra refers to the monumental, late-Baroque rural palace located along the Brenta Canal (Riviera del Brenta) at Via Doge Pisani 7 near the town of Stra, on the mainland of the Veneto, northern Italy. This villa is one of the largest examples of Villa Veneta located in the Riviera del Brenta, the canal linking Venice to Padua. The patrician Pisani family of Venice commissioned a number of villas, also known as Villa Pisani across the Venetian mainland. The villa and gardens now operate as a national museum, and the site sponsors art exhibitions.

History 
Construction of this palace was begun in the early 18th century for Alvise Pisani, the most prominent member of the Pisani family, who was appointed doge in 1735. The initial models of the palace by Paduan architect Girolamo Frigimelica still exist, but the design of the main building was ultimately completed by Francesco Maria Preti. When it was completed, the building had 114 rooms, in honour of its owner, the 114th Doge of Venice Alvise Pisani.

In 1807 it was bought by Napoleon from the Pisani Family, now in poverty due to great losses in gambling. In 1814 the building became the property of the House of Habsburg who transformed the villa into a place of vacation for the European aristocracy of that period. After 1866 the Villa became the property of the House of Savoy, who in 1882 transferred it to the Italian state. In 1934 it was partially restored to host the first meeting of Adolf Hitler and Benito Mussolini, after the riots in Austria.

Architecture 
From the outside, the facade of the oversized palace appears to command the site, facing the Brenta River some 30 kilometers from Venice. The villa is one of many villas along the canal, which the Venetian noble families and merchants started to build as early as the 15th century. The broad façade is topped with statuary, and presents an exuberantly decorated center entrance with monumental columns shouldered by atlantes (an atlas being a male version of a caryatid). It shelters a large complex with two inner courts and acres of gardens, stables, and a garden maze.

The largest room is the ballroom, where the 18th-century painter Giovanni Battista Tiepolo frescoed the two-story ceiling with a massive allegorical depiction of the Apotheosis or Glory of the Pisani family (painted 1760–1762). Tiepolo's son Gian Domenico Tiepolo, Crostato, Jacopo Guarana, Jacopo Amigoni, P.A. Novelli, and Gaspare Diziani also completed frescoes for various rooms in the villa. Another room of importance in the villa  is now known as the "Napoleon Room" (after his occupant), furnished with pieces from the Napoleonic and Habsburg periods and others from when the house was lived by the Pisani.

The most riotously splendid Tiepolo ceiling would influence his later depiction of the Glory of Spain for the throne room of the Royal Palace of Madrid; however, the grandeur and bombastic ambitions of the ceiling echo now contrast with the mainly uninhabited shell of a palace. The remainder of its nearly 100 rooms are now empty. The Venetian playwright Carlo Goldoni described the palace in its day as a place of "great fun, served meals, dance and shows".

Exhibitions
There are often exhibitions of ancient, modern and contemporary art. The halls host 150000 visitors a year. In 2007, the exhibition "I classici del contemporaneo" and "Extradimensionism" by Paolo Aldighieri. In 2008, an important exhibition by Mimmo Paladino. In 2009 "Impressionismo a Venezia, 1879–1933" by Emma Ciardi. In 2011 "Tutto score" by Oliviero Rainaldi.

See also
List of Baroque residences
Palladian Villas of the Veneto
Riviera del Brenta (The Brenta river)

References

External links

Official site of the Villa Pisani 
Giambattista Tiepolo, 1696–1770, a full text exhibition catalog from The Metropolitan Museum of Art, which includes material on Villa Pisani

Houses completed in the 18th century
Pisani, Stra
Gardens in Veneto
Italian Baroque gardens
Museums in Veneto
Historic house museums in Italy
National museums of Italy
Pisani family
Royal residences in Italy
18th-century architecture in Italy